The Beau Brummels, Volume 2 is the second studio album by American rock group The Beau Brummels. Released in August 1965, the album contains the U.S. top 40 hit "You Tell Me Why" 
and follow-up single "Don't Talk to Strangers."

The album was produced by Sylvester Stewart, later known as Sly Stone, although his involvement, according to lead singer Sal Valentino and guitarist-songwriter Ron Elliott, had diminished to the point the band does not recall any producer being in charge.

Volume 2, unlike the band's debut, Introducing the Beau Brummels, failed to chart on the Billboard 200. The album's lack of commercial success has been linked to the band's label, Autumn Records, verging on collapse at the time of the album's release, 
leading to a lack of distribution and promotion of the band's material.

Track listing 
All songs written by Ron Elliott, except where noted.

Side 1 
 "You Tell Me Why"  — 3:05
 "I Want You"  — 4:00
 "Doesn't Matter"  — 2:00
 "That's Alright" (Sal Valentino) — 2:12
 "Sometime at Night" (Bob Durand, Elliott) — 1:50
 "Can It Be" (Durand, Elliott) — 2:28

Side 2 
 "Sad Little Girl" — 3:30
 "Woman" (Durand, Elliott) — 2:48
 "Don't Talk to Strangers" (Durand, Elliott) — 2:21
 "I've Never Known" (Durand, Elliott) — 2:03
 "When It Comes to Your Love" — 2:11
 "In Good Time" — 1:49

Personnel
Sal Valentino -  vocals
Ron Elliott - lead guitar
Ron Meagher - guitar
Declan Mulligan - bass
John Petersen - drums (Lead vocal on "Sometimes At Night")

References

External links 
 [ The Beau Brummels, Volume 2] at Allmusic

1965 albums
The Beau Brummels albums
Albums produced by Sly Stone
Autumn Records albums